The 2014 Saskatchewan Roughriders season was the 57th season for the team in the Canadian Football League. The Roughriders qualified for the playoffs for a third straight season, but failed to defend their Grey Cup title as they lost the West Semi-Final to the Edmonton Eskimos. For the second consecutive season, the club held training camp at Griffiths Stadium in Saskatoon with the main camp beginning on June 1.

Offseason

Transactions
During the offseason, the Roughriders lost many key players from the 2013 season, including Weston Dressler, Kory Sheets, Craig Butler and Ricky Schmitt.

The Roughriders lost quarterbacks coach Khari Jones to the BC Lions, who went there to become the Lions' offensive coordinator. During the 2013 CFL Expansion Draft, they lost Keith Shologan, Zack Evans and James Lee to the Ottawa Redblacks. The Roughriders re-signed Terrell Maze, Taj Smith, Christopher Milo, Paul Woldu and Macho Harris who all were slated to become free agents in February 2014. In a trade with the Winnipeg Blue Bombers, the Roughriders traded Drew Willy for Jade Etienne. In a trade with the Hamilton Tiger-Cats, the Roughriders received Josh Bartel and Shomari Williams. 

In free agency, the Roughriders lost Craig Butler, Jermaine McElveen, Ricky Schmitt, Jock Sanders, Graig Newman and Abraham Kromah. The Roughriders signed David Lee.

The Roughriders lost two players to the National Football League, with Weston Dressler being signed by the Kansas City Chiefs and Kory Sheets being signed by the Oakland Raiders. Dressler returned to the Roughriders in August 2014.

CFL Draft
The 2014 CFL Draft took place on May 13, 2014. The Roughriders had eight selections total in the seven-round draft, after trading down in the draft twice to accumulate more lower-round selections.

Preseason
On February 10, 2014, it was announced that the Ottawa Redblacks will play their "home" pre-season game at Mosaic Stadium at Taylor Field against the Roughriders on June 14, 2014. Ottawa will be on the home side of the field and the team will be introduced as the home team, while Saskatchewan will play the game as their "away" pre-season game. This was done to accommodate for any delays that may be incurred due to the construction of TD Place Stadium.

Regular season

Season standings

Schedule

Post-season

Schedule

Team

Roster

Coaching staff

References

Saskatchewan Roughriders seasons
2014 Canadian Football League season by team
2014 in Saskatchewan